Ludvig Christian Brinck-Seidelin Kabell (21 July 1853, Vejlby, Norddjurs Municipality - 1 February 1902, Fredensborg) was a Danish landscape painter.

Biography
His father was a priest. When he was ten, the family moved to Zealand and he attended the  Herlufsholm School for six years. There, his drawing skills were noticed by the painter,  Georg Hilker, who took him to Copenhagen as his apprentice.

While there, he attended classes taught by P.C. Skovgaard at the Royal Danish Academy of Fine Arts, but was never formally admitted. This was the occasion, however, for making the acquaintance of Godfred Christensen, who aroused his interest in landscape painting.

He began by painting en plein aire with his friend Karl Jensen, and they mutually influenced each other's styles, although Jensen would come to focus on interior paintings.

His first major showing was at the Charlottenborg Spring Exhibition of 1878. This led to a sale of his work "Watering Hole Outside a Farmhouse" to the Kunstforeningen; an organization that would become a regular customer. He took a brief trip to Paris in 1880 then, thanks to a small stipend from the Academy, visited the Tyrol and Italy.

Upon returning in 1887, he married Baroness Rudolphine Wedell-Wedellsborg (1856-1920), the daughter of Baron ; forest administrator for the Vallø stift. In 1895, he was awarded the Eckersberg Medal.

References

External links 

ArtNet: More works by Kabell.

1853 births
1902 deaths
19th-century Danish painters
Danish male painters
Danish landscape painters
Recipients of the Eckersberg Medal
People from Norddjurs Municipality
19th-century Danish male artists